Uttenreuth is a town in the district of Erlangen-Höchstadt in Bavaria in Germany.

History
Uttenreuth was founded in the 12th century during the expansion of the empire around Nuremberg to the Schwabach valley east of Erlangen.

After 1946, Uttenreuth developed into a suburban residential area in the lower Schwabach valley. A territorial reform in 1978 led to the integration of the neighboring village Weiher.

Geography

Geographical location

Neighboring communities
Towns neighboring Uttenreuth are Dormitz (in the East), Neunkirchen am Brand (Northeast), Marloffstein (North), Spardorf (Northwest) and Buckenhof in the West. To the South, Uttenreuth borders a large forest, the Sebalder Reichswald.

Subdivisions
 Uttenreuth
 Weiher (integrated in 1978)

Traffic

The OVF bus 209, which runs through Uttenreuth, connects Erlangen and Eschenau.

The closest train station is located in Erlangen. Until the 1960s, Uttenreuth had its own train station which connected the cities of Erlangen and Gräfenberg

The town is also connected to Erlangen's bikeways, which are used by many commuters.

Literature
 Paulus, Erich and Regina Paulus. 2001. Uttenreuth - Geschichtsbuch über ein fränkisches Dorf am Rande der Stadt.

References

External links
Official website (German)

Erlangen-Höchstadt